Sophia Vandagne (born 2 November 1979) is a Seychellois former weightlifter and Olympian.

Competing in the women's 58 kg event at the 2000 Summer Olympics in Sydney, Sophia finished in thirteenth position with a total weight lifted of 160 kg.

In 1999, Vandagne was nominated Seychellois Young Female Athlete of the year.

References

1979 births
Living people
Seychellois female weightlifters
Olympic weightlifters of Seychelles
Weightlifters at the 2000 Summer Olympics